Robert Archibald Nisbet (23 November 1900 – 13 September 1986), known as Archie Nisbet, was a British rower, born in Kensington, who competed in the 1928 Summer Olympics.

Nisbet was a member of London Rowing Club. In 1927, partnering Terence O'Brien, he won Silver Goblets at Henley Royal Regatta.  In 1928 the pair were chosen to compete in the coxless pairs for Great Britain rowing at the 1928 Summer Olympics, where they won the silver medal.

References

External links
 

1900 births
1986 deaths
Rowers from Greater London
Sportspeople from Kensington
British male rowers
Olympic rowers of Great Britain
Rowers at the 1928 Summer Olympics
Olympic silver medallists for Great Britain
Olympic medalists in rowing
Medalists at the 1928 Summer Olympics